Petco Park is a baseball stadium in Downtown San Diego, California. It is the home ballpark of Major League Baseball's San Diego Padres, and has also been used as a venue for concerts, soccer, golf, football, and rugby. 

The ballpark is located between Seventh and 10th Avenues south of J Street. The park opened in 2004, replacing Qualcomm Stadium as the home stadium of the Padres. The southern side of the stadium is bounded by San Diego Trolley light rail tracks along the north side of Harbor Drive, which serve the adjacent San Diego Convention Center. The portion of K Street between Seventh and 10th now is closed to automobiles and serves as a pedestrian promenade along the back of the left and center field outfield seating and also provides access to the Park at the Park behind center field. 

Two of the stadium's outfield entrance areas are located at K Street's intersections with Seventh and 10th avenues. The main entrance, behind home plate, is at the south end of Park Boulevard (at Imperial) and faces the San Diego Trolley station 12th & Imperial Transit Center.

History

Construction

The ballpark was constructed by San Diego Ballpark Builders, a partnership with Clark Construction, ROEL Construction and Douglas E. Barnhart, Inc. The construction cost of more than $450 million was partially funded by a public-private partnership which included the Center City Development Corporation and the San Diego Redevelopment Agency. The stadium was intended to be part of a comprehensive plan to revitalize San Diego's aging downtown, particularly the East Village area. The stadium is across Harbor Drive from the San Diego Convention Center, and its main entrance behind home plate is two blocks from the downtown terminal of the San Diego Trolley light rail system.

The ballpark was scheduled to open for the 2002 season; however, construction was suspended temporarily for legal and political reasons. Part of this was a court decision, which nullified an already passed ballot proposition approving the city's portion of the stadium financing package and required the proposition be put to voters a second time. Construction encountered a further delay regarding the Western Metal Supply Co. building, which was a historic landmark. After negotiations with the preservation community, the builders agreed to rehabilitate the building in accordance with the Secretary of the Interior's standards, and the building was renovated and included in the stadium design in an example of adaptive reuse.

The resulting delays required the Padres to play the 2002 and 2003 seasons at Jack Murphy/Qualcomm Stadium.

Naming rights
San Diego-based pet supplies retailer Petco originally bought naming rights to the stadium for $60 million in a 22-year deal. In 2021, Petco signed a new deal with the Padres that ensured the stadium would be named Petco Park through at least 2027.

Baseball milestones
The first baseball game was played at Petco Park on March 11, 2004. It was part of a four-team NCAA invitational tournament hosted by San Diego State University. The San Diego State Aztecs baseball team, of which retired Padres player Tony Gwynn was the head coach, defeated Houston.  It was the largest attended game in college baseball history. Lance Zawadzki recorded the first hit, when he hit a double. On April 8, 2004, the Padres played their first regular season game at Petco Park and defeated the San Francisco Giants 4–3 in 10 innings. On April 15, 2004, Mark Loretta hit the first Padre home run off of Hideo Nomo of the Los Angeles Dodgers. It was caught by Mike Hill, a bartender at the Kansas City Barbecue.

The stadium's first playoff game was played on October 8, 2005. The St. Louis Cardinals beat the Padres, 7–4, to finish off the three-game sweep of the 2005 NLDS.

On March 18 and 20, 2006, the ballpark hosted the semifinals and finals of the first World Baseball Classic. It also hosted second-round games of the 2009 World Baseball Classic. On April 4, 2006, Petco Park had its first rainout, postponing a Padres evening game against the San Francisco Giants.

On August 4, 2007, Barry Bonds hit his 755th home run to tie Hank Aaron's record.

On April 17, 2008, the Padres and Rockies played in a 22-inning game, the longest game in Petco Park history. The Rockies won the game, 2–1. It was the longest MLB game in nearly 15 years.

On July 2, 2009, MLB experienced the first game delayed/halted by a swarm of bees at Petco Park in a game between the Padres and the Houston Astros.  A small swarm of honeybees took up residence around a chair in left field, causing the game to be delayed by 52 minutes.  A beekeeper was called in and the swarm was exterminated. The Astros went on to win that game, 7–2.

Play stopped momentarily in the eighth inning. The Blue Jays went on to win 6–3.

Rain delays led to the suspension of the Padres' game with the Los Angeles Dodgers on April 8, 2011. The first delay caused the game to start 28 minutes late. Play then was stopped for more than 90 minutes in the second inning  and again in the sixth inning for more than hour.  The score was tied at 2–2 in the top of the ninth inning when play was suspended at 1:40 a.m.  PDT April 9. After a fourth rain delay, the game was finished April 9, with the Dodgers winning in 11 innings, 4–2.

On April 30, 2012, Milwaukee Brewers outfielder Ryan Braun became the first player to hit three home runs in one game at the park. Braun finished the game 4–5 with three home runs and a triple.

On July 13, 2013, Tim Lincecum threw the park's first no-hitter for the visiting San Francisco Giants as they defeated the Padres, 9–0.

The park hosted the 2016 Major League Baseball All-Star Game.

In 2017, Petco Park played host to Pool F of the 2017 World Baseball Classic, in which host USA and undefeated Puerto Rico advanced to the semi-finals. 

For the 2020 MLB postseason, the park was one of two stadiums (along with Dodger Stadium) to host neutral-site games of the ALDS, and was also the only stadium to host neutral-site games of the ALCS.

Eduardo Escobar of the New York Mets was the first player to hit for the cycle in the history of Petco Park on June 6, 2022. Later that year, the Padres made it to the postseason as the 5th wild card seed with a 89-73 record. Petco Park hosted its very first postseason game featuring the Padres with fans in attendance in 16 years, as they squared off against the 110-win division rival Los Angeles Dodgers in game 3 of the NLDS. The San Diego Padres would go on to win the series 3-1. On October 18th, 2022, Kyle Schwarber of the Philadelphia Phillies hit the longest home run ever recorded at Petco Park at 488 feet in game one of the NLCS.

Notable events

Other sports

Rugby
In February 2007, Petco Park became the new host of the USA Sevens, a rugby union sevens event within the IRB Sevens World Series. Previous editions of the USA Sevens had been held at The Home Depot Center in the Los Angeles suburb of Carson. After the 2009 edition, the event moved to Las Vegas.

Tennis
From January 31 through February 2 in 2014, Petco Park's left-center field temporarily was converted into a red clay tennis court for the Davis Cup tie between United States and Great Britain.

Motor sports
In January 2015, Petco Park hosted rounds of Monster Jam and AMA Supercross Championship, as a replacement for Qualcomm Stadium.

Golf
Since 2015, Petco Park has partnered with Callaway Golf Company to open a par-3 nine-hole golf course within the stadium the first week of each November. The holes are built within the outfield while many of the tees are in the upper decks of the stadium.

Basketball
On December 7, 2015, Petco Park hosted its first college basketball game between the San Diego Toreros and the San Diego State Aztecs as part of the Bill Walton Basketball Festival held in San Diego.

Football
On January 25, 2017, following the relocation of the Chargers NFL franchise to Los Angeles, it was announced that exploratory discussions were taking place regarding the possibility of playing the Holiday Bowl at Petco Park in future years. On June 24, 2021, the Padres announced a partnership with the San Diego Bowl Game Association for the Holiday Bowl to take place at Petco Park for a minimum of the next five years. The first Holiday Bowl at Petco Park would have taken place on December 28, 2021 between the UCLA Bruins and NC State Wolfpack. Hours before kickoff, UCLA withdrew due to positive COVID tests and the game was canceled.

Ice hockey
Petco Park is considered a future venue for both AHL Outdoor Classic and NHL Winter Classic. As they are both under the same ownership, it is possible that the San Diego Gulls would play the Outdoor Classic on New Year's Eve with the Anaheim Ducks playing the Winter Classic on New Year's Day. If awarded the Winter Classic, the Ducks would invite teams such as the Los Angeles Kings, San Jose Sharks, Vegas Golden Knights, Colorado Avalanche or Dallas Stars to be their opponent.

Concerts

Other events
Season 11 auditions for the singing reality-television program American Idol were held Friday, July 8, 2011, at Petco Park.

In 2011, the Food Network filmed a "Chairman's Challenge" at Petco Park that was to air as part of Season 4, episode 2 of The Next Iron Chef.

In 2019, TwitchCon took place in the Convention Center with the TwitchCon Party featuring Blink-182, Madeon, Au/Ra, and Y2K was held on September 28, 2019 at Petco Park.

Comic-Con International
Due to a lack of space in the Convention Center, Comic-Con International and other companies associated with entertainment have been allowed to host activities in Petco Park. On July 29, 2018, Rocket League held their third birthday party as an offsite event part of San Diego Comic-Con 2018.

Media

Petco Park can be seen and can even be entered in the video game Midnight Club 3 in the city of San Diego.

Petco Park and Fenway Park were visibly fused together to create "Greenway Park" in Call of Duty Ghosts.

PETA protest
During stadium construction, the Padres offered fans the chance to purchase bricks outside of the concourse and to dedicate them. PETA tried to purchase a brick to protest Petco's treatment of animals (PETA and Petco have a long-standing dispute over this matter), but the first two attempts were denied. Undeterred, PETA succeeded on its third attempt by purchasing a brick, which read "Break Open Your Cold Ones Toast The Padres Enjoy This Champion Organization."  When one reads the first letter of each word, it forms an acrostic which reads "BOYCOTT PETCO." The Padres decided to leave the brick, saying not enough people walking by would notice the secret meaning.

Features and design

Petco Park differentiates itself from many other Major League ballparks built in the same era by eschewing "retro-style" red brick and green seats. The stadium is clad in Indian sandstone and stucco; its exposed steel is painted white and the 40,209 fixed seats are dark blue. The design is meant to evoke the sandy color of San Diego cliffs and beaches, the blue of the ocean, and the white sails of boats on the nearby bay.

Architects Populous (née HOK Sport) and Antoine Predock's design pulled restaurants, administrative offices and other amenities away from the seating bowl itself into other buildings surrounding the bowl. As a result, the ballpark's concourses are open not only to the playing field but also to the surrounding city. Unlike many outdoor ballparks, in which the batter faces northeast, at Petco the batter faces due north, and fans in the grandstands are treated to a view of San Diego Bay and the San Diego skyline beyond the left field seats, as well as a view of Balboa Park, which contains the San Diego Zoo, beyond center field. The San Diego Union-Tribune honored the ballpark in 2006 with an Orchid award for its design.

Petco Park's official address is 19 Tony Gwynn Way, in honor of the eight-time National League batting champion who wore that uniform number during his major league career. A  statue of Gwynn was unveiled July 21, 2007, on the stadium grounds.  On August 18, 2018, a statue of National League Saves Leader and longtime Padre Trevor Hoffman was unveiled along K Street behind the bullpen, facing Gwynn's statue.

The Park at the Park, a grassy berm sloping above the outfield fence, is open during games, allowing fans to sit and watch games for $10. When no games are being played, the Park at the Park serves as a free local park for area residents. An unusual feature Petco Park once had was that the home team bullpen was located behind the center field wall while the bullpen for the visiting team was in foul territory in right field.  However, both bullpens were moved behind the center field wall after modifications to the ballpark were made prior to the start of the 2013 season. For the 2012 season, the Park at the Park area also plays host to a semi-permanent stage used by the Padres' new broadcaster, at the time known as Fox Sports San Diego, for pre-game and post-game programming.

The current left-field HD videoboard, manufactured by Daktronics, was installed in 2015. The Padres can show full-screen live game action, video replays, or fan prompts or split the screen into sections for statistical information, graphics, and animations.

The Padres also added eight mini scoreboards located under overhangs in the seating bowl on the field level, along with new 60-in. Sony TVs in the same areas, to give fans seated in the back of those sections better views.

To support the new HD videoboards, the Padres partnered with Sony and Diversified Systems on an HD control room. Located on the press level on the third-base side, the control room houses a Sony MVS8000x switcher, ChyronHego graphics servers, Click Effects CrossFire servers, and Evertz router, DreamCatcher replay servers, and terminal gear. The team will deploy a complement of Sony HSC300 cameras and two wireless roving cameras while it considers additional models for 4K acquisition.

The Western Metal Supply Co. building, a hundred-year-old brick structure that had been scheduled for demolition to make way for Petco Park, was saved and incorporated into the design of the ballpark. The building was renovated and contains the team store, private suites, a restaurant and rooftop seating. The southeast corner of the building serves as the left field foul pole, and is protected by a strip of bright yellow angle iron.

Fans in concession stands, in bars, restaurants or wandering the stands can watch the action on 244 HDTV monitors and an additional 500 SDTVs. More than 500 computer-controlled speakers throughout the park deliver the sound as a "distributed signal", eliminating the audio delay from a central bank of speakers, such as the system at Qualcomm Stadium. Four stationary cameras, one roving camera and use of six Cox-TV cameras provide videos for the park's screens.

Every time the Padres hit a home run and/or win the game, a ship's whistle is sounded and fireworks are shot off in center field.  Beginning with the 2011 season, four torches were added to the center field wall that light up when the Padres hit a home run and/or win the game.  The ship's whistle is a recording of the whistle of the Navy's , a nuclear aircraft carrier that was ported in San Diego.

There are a total of 5,000 club seats and 58 luxury suites at the ballpark.

Modifications
Petco Park has been described as being an "extreme pitcher's park". During the 2005–06 offseason, Padres CEO Sandy Alderson adjusted the dimensions in right-center field in an attempt to make it more hitter friendly. At the end of the 2008 season, Petco Park ranked 29th in hits and 30th out of 30 in home runs per Major League ballpark.

Following the conclusion of the 2012 season, the Padres announced that they were moving the fences in to make this ballpark more favorable to hitters than it had been previously. In addition, the visiting team bullpen was moved from foul territory in right field to behind the left-center field wall, right behind where the Padres bullpen is.

After the conclusion of the 2014 season, more renovations to the park commenced. These include a new HD video board, slight changes to the distance to the left-field fence, and removal of some seats in the middle deck (which were replaced with standing-room seating). The alterations, including the new video board, were completed by Opening Day 2015.

Climate

See also 

 Public-private partnerships in the United States

References

External links

Stadium site on MLB.com
High Resolution Aerial Photo of Petco Park
Official website
Petco Park Seating Chart
Petco Park Insider: Guide to Padres games at Petco Park
The Official Site of the San Diego Padres 

2004 establishments in California
Antoine Predock buildings
Baseball venues in California
Buildings and structures in San Diego
Landmarks in San Diego
Major League Baseball venues
Motorsport venues in California
NCAA bowl game venues
Populous (company) buildings
Rugby union stadiums in San Diego
San Diego Padres stadiums
Sports venues completed in 2004
Sports venues in San Diego
World Baseball Classic venues
World Rugby Sevens Series venues